Busan Ilbo is a Korean language newspaper published in the South Korean city of Busan.

References

External links
 Busan Ilbo Official website

Newspapers published in South Korea
Korean-language newspapers
Mass media in Busan